The  is a railway line in Japan operated by the private railway operator Nagoya Railroad (Meitetsu). It connects Inuyama Station in Inuyama, Aichi with Mitake Station in Mitake, Gifu.

Stations 
● L: 
● LE: 
● MU: 

All trains stop at stations marked "●" and pass stations marked "|".

Closed stations
 Katabira Station (between Aiki and )
 Gakkōmae Station (between Maeba and )

History

The Shinkani to Hiromi section was opened in 1920 by the Tobi Railway as a  gauge light railway. In 1928, the line was converted to  gauge, electrified at 600 V DC, and extended to Inuyama. The company merged with Meitetsu in 1943. The voltage was raised to 1,500 V DC in 1965, and the Inuyama to Shinkani section was double-tracked between 1967 and 1970. Freight services ceased in 1982.

Former connecting lines
 Akechi Station: The Tobi Railway opened a  line to Yaotsu, electrified at 600 V DC, in 1930. The company merged with Meitetsu in 1943. Between 1952 and 1954, the line was extended to Nishikori to supply construction materials for the Maruyama Dam and hydro-electric power station. The voltage was increased to 1,500 V DC in 1965, but the overhead catenary was decommissioned in 1984. DMUs were then operated on the line until it closed in 2001.

See also
 List of railway lines in Japan

References
This article incorporates material from the corresponding article in the Japanese Wikipedia.

External links 

  
  

Hiromi Line
Rail transport in Aichi Prefecture
Rail transport in Gifu Prefecture
Railway lines opened in 1952
1067 mm gauge railways in Japan
1920 establishments in Japan